A partial lunar eclipse took place on October 17, 2005, the second of two lunar eclipses in 2005. A tiny bite out of the Moon may have been visible at maximum, though just 6.25% of the Moon was shadowed in a partial eclipse which lasted for nearly 56 minutes and was visible over east Asia, Australasia, and most of the North America. A shading across the moon from the Earth's penumbral shadow should have been visible at maximum eclipse.

Visibility 

It was visible from Southeast Asia, the Pacific, Australia and New Zealand after sunset, and in the western side of North America before sunrise.

A simulated view of the earth from the center of the moon at maximum eclipse.

Map

Gallery

Relation to other eclipses

Eclipse season 

This is the second eclipse this season.

First eclipse this season: 3 October 2005 Annular Solar Eclipse

Eclipses of 2005
 A hybrid solar eclipse on April 8.
 A penumbral lunar eclipse on April 24.
 An annular solar eclipse on October 3.
 A partial lunar eclipse on October 17.

Lunar year series 
It is the last of four lunar year cycles, repeating every 354 days.

Metonic series 
This eclipse is the last of four Metonic cycle lunar eclipses on the same date, October 17–18, each separated by 19 years:

Half-Saros cycle
A lunar eclipse will be preceded and followed by solar eclipses by 9 years and 5.5 days (a half saros). This lunar eclipse is related to two partial solar eclipses of Solar Saros 153.

See also 
List of lunar eclipses and List of 21st-century lunar eclipses
May 2003 lunar eclipse
November 2003 lunar eclipse
May 2004 lunar eclipse
:File:Visibility Lunar Eclipse 2005-10-17.png
 :File:2005-10-17 Lunar Eclipse Sketch.gif Chart

References

External links
 http://www.hermit.org/eclipse/2005-10-17/
 
 http://www.space.com/spacewatch/051014_lunar_eclipse.html
 https://web.archive.org/web/20090914132101/http://www.astronomy.org.au/ngn/media/client/factsheet_16.pdf
 Photos
 http://www.starrynightphotos.com/moon/partial_lunar_eclipse_2005.htm Kaituna, Wairarapa, New Zealand
 http://outdoors.webshots.com/album/479147839tyCCAg Taipei, Taiwan
 http://christys-adventuresinlearning.blogspot.com/2008/02/lunar-eclipse-2008.html Seoul, South Korea

2005-10
2005 in science
October 2005 events